Kavallari is a village and a community of the Zagori municipality. Before the 2011 local government reform it was part of the municipality of East Zagori, of which it was a municipal district. The 2011 census recorded 78 inhabitants in the village. The community of Kavallari covers an area of 21.031 km2.

See also
List of settlements in the Ioannina regional unit

References

Populated places in Ioannina (regional unit)